The Labor Right, also known as Modern Labor, is a political faction of the Australian Labor Party (ALP) at the national level that is characterised by being more economically liberal and, in some cases, more socially conservative. The Labor Right is a broad alliance of various state factions and competes with the Labor Left faction.

State branches 
Factional power usually finds expression in the percentage vote of aligned delegates at party conferences. The power of the Labor Right varies from state to state, but it usually relies on certain trade unions, such as the Australian Workers' Union (AWU), Transport Workers Union (TWU), the Shop, Distributive and Allied Employees Association (SDA) and the Health Services Union (HSU). These unions send delegates to the conference, with delegates usually coming from the membership, the administration of the union or local branches covered by their activists.

State-based factions (national sub-factions) which make up Labor Right include:
 New South Wales
 Centre Unity.
 Queensland
 Labor Forum (dominated by the AWU).
 Australian Capital Territory
 Centre Coalition.
 Victoria
 Labor Centre Unity (The Shorts: consisting of branch members and unions aligned with Bill Shorten, in particular the Australian Workers Union).
 Labor Unity (Formerly the Cons: Consisting largely of Branch Members aligned to and supporters of Labor Deputy Leader Richard Marles and the Transport Workers Union).
 Moderate Labor (Mods: defectors from the Shoppies).
 Shoppies (SDA: also known as Labor Unity, largely union-based).
 Western Australia
WA Labor Unity (TWU, SDA, AWU).
Progressive Labor (Consists of TWU, SDA, AWU, MUA and CFMEU). An alliance between WA Labor Unity and the 'Industrial left' unions of WA, formed in 2019 for the purpose of binding at State conferences against some subgroups within WA's Broad left; such as the UWU. Historically, the MUA and CFMEU have voted at State conferences in alignment with the Broad left.
 Northern Territory
 Labor Unity.
 South Australia
 Labor Unity (dominated by the SDA).
 Tasmania
 Labor Unity.

Political views 
An overriding stated theme of the more moderate wing of Labor governance is balance between progressive social change and conservative economic management as the pathway to community development and growth.

Many Roman Catholics have been prominent and influential in the Labor Party, both inside and outside the auspices of the Labor Right faction. Their influence had been criticised by many older Labor socialists and Protestant conservatives for being beholden to religious authority. However, this sentiment has decreased since the 1970s with the erosion of religious sectarianism in Australian politics.

The Labor Right views itself as the more mainstream and fiscally conservative faction within Labor. The faction is most famous for its support of Third Way economic policies over Labor's traditional early twentieth century social democratic policies, such as the economic rationalist policies of the Bob Hawke and Paul Keating governments, including floating the Australian dollar in December 1983, reductions in trade tariffs, taxation reforms such as the introduction of dividend imputation to eliminate double-taxation of dividends and the lowering of the top marginal income tax rate from 60% in 1983 to 47% in 1996, changing from centralised wage-fixing to enterprise bargaining, the privatisation of Qantas and Commonwealth Bank, making the Reserve Bank of Australia independent, and deregulating the banking system.

Youth Wing 
While the senior faction is broken into various state- and union-based groupings the Young Labor Right is organised around the various parliamentarian factional leaders and power brokers. The Victorian Young Labor Right is currently divided between the Conroy aligned (Young Labor Unity), the SDA (Victorian Labor Students), the TWU (Labor Progressive Unity), AWU (Young Labor Centre Unity), the NUW (Young Labor Action) and Moderate aligned grouping. The NSW Young Labor Right known as Young Centre Unity is the largest Labor Right youth faction.

Federal Members of the Labor Right 

‡ Sterle was formerly a member of the now-defunct Centre Left.

See also 
 Labor Left
 :Category: Labor Right politicians, current and former parliamentary members of the Labor Right
 Moderates (Centrist faction in the Liberal Party of Australia)
 New Democrats (centrist faction in the Democratic Party of the United States)
 Blue Dogs (conservative faction in the Democratic Party of the United States)
 Progress (organisation associated with the Labour Party (UK))

References

Further reading 
 Cumming, Fia (1991) Mates : five champions of the Labor right. Sydney: Allen & Unwin. . Library catalogue summary: Paul Keating, Graham Richardson, Laurie Brereton, Bob Carr and Leo McLeay recount events which shaped the Australian labour movement from the 1960s to the 1980s.
 Richardson, G (1994) Whatever It Takes, Bantam Books, Moorebank, NSW. Library catalogue summary: Graham Richardson recounts his career and outlines the philosophy and operation of the NSW and National Labor Right during his time in the ALP.

Australian Labor Party factions
Centrism in Australia